KXZZ (1580 AM) was a radio station broadcasting a sports format. It was licensed to Lake Charles, Louisiana, United States, and served the Lake Charles area. The station was last owned by Cumulus Media. Its studios were located on Broad Street in downtown Lake Charles and its transmitter was located north of downtown east of Calcasieu River.

History

Frank R. Gibson obtained a construction permit to build a new 1,000-watt, daytime-only radio station in Lake Charles on October 16, 1946. The station went on air in 1947 as KLOU and joined CBS on November 1.

KXZZ's license was surrendered to the Federal Communications Commission and canceled on December 28, 2021.

References

External links
FCC Station Search Details: DKXZZ (Facility ID: 17016)
FCC History Cards for KXZZ (covering 1945-1979 as KLOU)

XZZ
Cumulus Media radio stations
Radio stations established in 1947
Radio stations disestablished in 2021
Defunct radio stations in the United States
Defunct mass media in Louisiana
1947 establishments in Louisiana
2021 disestablishments in Louisiana